The Bowman House is a historic house located at 714 Broadway Street in Wisconsin Dells, Wisconsin. The Prairie School house was built in 1904 for Abram and Alberta Bowman. The house has a Prairie School design, popular at the time due to Frank Lloyd Wright's influence; its distinctive Prairie School elements include a horizontal emphasis and a low roof with wide eaves. Abram Bowman died in 1907, and his daughters Emma and Jennie Bowman inherited the house. Jennie Bowman had the house converted to a vacation home for working women upon her death in 1934. The house remained a vacation home until 1977, when the Dells Country Historical Society converted it to a historic house museum.

The house was added to the National Register of Historic Places on April 3, 1986.

See also
 National Register of Historic Places listings in Wisconsin

References

External links
Dells County Historical Society

Houses on the National Register of Historic Places in Wisconsin
Houses completed in 1904
Historic house museums in Wisconsin
Wisconsin Dells, Wisconsin
Houses in Columbia County, Wisconsin
Prairie School architecture in Wisconsin
Museums in Columbia County, Wisconsin
1904 establishments in Wisconsin
National Register of Historic Places in Columbia County, Wisconsin